Olds-Didsbury was a provincial electoral district in central Alberta, Canada, mandated to return a single member to the Legislative Assembly of Alberta using the first-past-the-post method of voting from 1963 to 1997.

It is noteworthy as the location of a famous by-election in 1982, when the separatist Western Canada Concept achieved the first and only electoral victory in the movement's history.

History

The riding was created in 1963 when the Olds and Didsbury districts were merged. Incumbent MLA for Didsbury Robert Clark ran in the new riding for Social Credit, and was easily re-elected. He was appointed to cabinet by premier Ernest Manning in 1966 and re-appointed by Harry Strom.

In the 1971 election, when Peter Lougheed's Progressive Conservatives swept Social Credit out of power, Clark retained Olds-Didsbury by a wide margin. He then served as opposition leader while Social Credit leader Werner Schmidt had no seat in the legislature, and when Schmidt resigned after failing to improve the party's fortunes, Clark won the leadership of the party, continuing as opposition leader. As party leader he won the largest majority in the history of Olds-Didsbury in the 1979 election, but the party failed to make inroads elsewhere. He subsequently resigned as party leader and MLA.

The resulting by-election in Olds-Didsbury shocked the political establishment in Canada, as Gordon Kesler of the separatist Western Canada Concept cruised to a surprise victory, due to anger over the National Energy Program and the patriation of the Constitution of Canada under Pierre Trudeau.

The premier called a snap election for later that year to ensure a quick showdown with Western Canada Concept. Kesler chose to run in Highwood, where he lived, and was defeated by a huge margin. This rendered him the shortest-serving MLA in Alberta history, counting from election to defeat. The Progressive Conservatives also finally captured Olds-Didsbury, where Stephen Stiles nearly doubled previous Progressive Conservative results amid a surge in turnout.

Stiles served only one term as MLA. Progressive Conservative candidate Roy Brassard easily defended Olds-Didsbury for his party,  serving three terms. Brassard was appointed to cabinet as Minister for Seniors under Lougheed in 1991, and retired upon the dissolution of the Legislature in 1997. At the same time, Olds-Didsbury was merged with the north part of Three Hills-Airdrie to form Olds-Didsbury-Three Hills.

Election Results

Elections in the 1960s

Elections in the 1970s

Elections in the 1980s

Elections in the 1990s

See also
List of Alberta provincial electoral districts
Olds, a town in central Alberta
Didsbury, a town in central Alberta

References

Further reading

External links
Elections Alberta
The Legislative Assembly of Alberta

Former provincial electoral districts of Alberta